In Old Alsace (French title:L'ami Fritz) is a 1933 French drama film directed by Jacques de Baroncelli and starring Lucien Duboscq, Simone Bourday and Madeleine Guitty.

The film's sets were designed by the art director Jean d'Eaubonne.

Cast
 Lucien Duboscq as Fritz Kobus  
 Simone Bourday as Suzel  
 Madeleine Guitty as Catherine  
 Jacques de Féraudy as Frédéric  
 Charles Lamy as David Sichel, le rabbin  
 Jean Coquelin as Un célibataire  
 Carjol as Le percepteur 
 Lisa Aubertin

References

Bibliography 
 Goble, Alan. The Complete Index to Literary Sources in Film. Walter de Gruyter, 1999.

External links 
 

1933 films
1933 drama films
French drama films
1930s French-language films
Films directed by Jacques de Baroncelli
Films based on French novels
French black-and-white films
1930s French films